Brian Jacks Superstar Challenge is a 1985 sports simulation game released for various home computers by Martech, licensed by British sportsman, Brian Jacks. It was released for systems including the Commodore 64, BBC Micro, and Acorn Electron.

Critical response
Electron User praised its "superb graphics" and the variety found in the different games.

References

1985 video games
Amstrad CPC games
BBC Micro and Acorn Electron games
Commodore 64 games
MSX games
Video games developed in the United Kingdom
ZX Spectrum games
Martech games